The 2020 Baltimore Orioles season was the 120th season in Baltimore Orioles franchise history, the 67th in Baltimore, and the 29th at Oriole Park at Camden Yards. The season was the Orioles' second under manager Brandon Hyde. They finished the pandemic-shortened season 25–35, their best 60-game stretch since 2017. The Orioles had their highest winning percentage since 2017 when they went 75–87. Despite these improvements, they missed the playoffs for the fourth consecutive season as they were eliminated from playoff contention on September 22.

Regular season standings

American League East

American League Wild Card

Record vs. Opponents

Game log

|- bgcolor=#fbb
| 1 || July 24 || @ Red Sox || 2–13 || Eovaldi (1–0) || Milone (0–1) ||—|| 0–1 || L1
|- bgcolor=#bfb
| 2 || July 25 || @ Red Sox || 7–2 || Cobb (1–0) || Pérez (0–1) ||—|| 1–1 || W1
|- bgcolor=#bfb
| 3 || July 26 || @ Red Sox || 7–4 || LeBlanc (1–0) || Weber (0–1) || Sulser (1) || 2–1 || W2
|- bgcolor=#bbb
|—|| July 27 || @ Marlins || colspan=6 | Postponed (COVID-19). Makeup Date August 5 as part of doubleheader
|- bgcolor=#bbb
|—|| July 28 || @ Marlins || colspan=6 | Postponed (COVID-19). Makeup Date August 6.
|- bgcolor=#bbb
|—|| July 29 || Marlins || colspan=6 | Postponed (COVID-19). Makeup Date August 4.
|- bgcolor=#bbb
|—|| July 30 || Marlins || colspan=6 | Postponed (COVID-19). Makeup Date August 5 as part of doubleheader.
|- bgcolor=#fbb
| 4 || July 29 || Yankees || 3–9 || Cole (2–0) || Wojciechowski (0–1) ||—|| 2–2 || L1
|- bgcolor=#fbb
| 5 || July 30 || Yankees || 6–8 || Loáisiga (1–0) || Sulser (0–1) || Britton (2) || 2–3 || L2
|- bgcolor=#bfb
| 6 || July 31 || Rays || 6–3 || Fry (1–0) || Fairbanks (1–1) || Sulser (2) || 3–3 || W1
|-

|- bgcolor=#bfb
| 7 || August 1 || Rays || 5–4  || Lakins (1–0) || Drake (0–2) ||—|| 4–3 || W2
|- bgcolor=#bfb
| 8 || August 2 || Rays || 5–1 || Phillips (1–0) || Beeks (0–1) || Sulser (3) || 5–3 || W3
|- bgcolor=#bbb
|—|| August 3 || Yankees || colspan=6 | Postponed (COVID-19). Makeup Date September 4 as part of doubleheader.
|- bgcolor=#fbb
| 9 || August 4 || Marlins || 0–4 || López (1–0) || Means (0–1) ||—|| 5–4 || L1
|- bgcolor=#fbb
| 10 || August 5 || Marlins || 0–1  || Vincent (1–0) || Cobb (1–1) || Kintzler (2) || 5–5 || L2
|- bgcolor=#fbb
| 11 || August 5 || @ Marlins || 1–2  || Moran (1–0) || Wojciechowski (0–2) || Tarpley (1) || 5–6 || L3
|- bgcolor=#fbb
| 12 || August 6 || @ Marlins || 7–8 || Morin (1–0) || Phillips (1–1) || Kintzler (3) || 5–7 || L4
|- bgcolor=#bfb
| 13 || August 7 || @ Nationals || 11–0 || Milone (1–1) || Sánchez (0–2) ||—|| 6–7 || W1
|- bgcolor=#bfb
| 14 || August 8 || @ Nationals || 5–3 || Armstrong (1–0) || Hudson (1–1) || Castro (1) || 7–7 || W2
|- bgcolor=#bbb
|—|| August 9 || @ Nationals || colspan=6 | Suspended (field issues). Orioles lead 5–2, 1 out, top of 6th inning, runners on 1st & 2nd. Completed on August 14.
|- bgcolor=#bfb
| 15 || August 11 || @ Phillies || 10–9  || Sulser (1–1) || Guerra (1–2) || Lakins (1) || 8–7 || W3
|- bgcolor=#bfb
| 16 || August 12 || @ Phillies || 5–4 || Armstrong (2–0) || Eflin (0–1) || Sulser (4) || 9–7 || W4
|- bgcolor=#bfb
| 17 || August 13 || @ Phillies || 11–4 || Eshelman (1–0) || Arrieta (1–2) ||—|| 10–7 || W5
|- bgcolor=#bfb
| 18 || August 14 || @ Nationals || 6–2 || Lakins (2–0) || Strasburg (0–1) ||—|| 11–7 || W6
|- bgcolor=#fbb
| 19 || August 14 || Nationals || 3–15 || Fedde (1–1) || Milone (1–2) ||—|| 11–8 || L1
|- bgcolor=#bfb
| 20 || August 15 || Nationals || 7–3 || Wojciechowski (1–2) || Corbin (2–1) || Sulser (5) || 12–8 || W1
|- bgcolor=#fbb
| 21 || August 16 || Nationals || 5–6 || Scherzer (2–1) || Lakins (2–1) || Hudson (4) || 12–9 || L1
|- bgcolor=#fbb
| 22 || August 17 || Blue Jays || 2–7 || Ryu (2–1) || Cobb (1–2) ||—|| 12–10 || L2
|- bgcolor=#fbb
| 23 || August 18 || Blue Jays || 7–8  || Bass (1–0) || Sulser (1–2) ||—|| 12–11 || L3
|- bgcolor=#fbb
| 24 || August 19 || Blue Jays || 2–5 || Roark (2–1) || Milone (1–3) || Dolis (1) || 12–12 || L4
|- bgcolor=#fbb
| 25 || August 20 || Red Sox || 1–7 || Eovaldi (2–2) || Wojciechowski (1–3) ||—|| 12–13 || L5
|- bgcolor=#fbb
| 26 || August 21 || Red Sox || 5–8 || Hernández (1–0) || Means (0–2) || Barnes (1) || 12–14 || L6
|- bgcolor=#bfb
| 27 || August 22 || Red Sox || 5–4  || Castro (1–0) || Barnes (1–2) ||—|| 13–14 || W1
|- bgcolor=#bfb
| 28 || August 23 || Red Sox || 5–4 || Eshelman (2–0) || Godley (0–3) || Scott (1) || 14–14 || W2
|- bgcolor=#fbb
| 29 || August 25 || @ Rays || 2–4 || Glasnow (1–1) || Milone (1–4) || García (1) || 14–15 || L1
|- bgcolor=#fbb
| 30 || August 26 || @ Rays || 3–4 || Sherriff (1–0) || Givens (0–1) || Castillo (1) || 14–16 || L2
|- bgcolor=#bbb
|—|| August 27 || @ Rays || colspan=6 | Postponed (strikes due to shooting of Jacob Blake). Makeup Date: September 17.
|- bgcolor=#fbb
| 31 || August 28 || @ Blue Jays || 4–5  || Dolis (1–1) || Sulser (1–3) ||—|| 14–17 || L3
|- bgcolor=#fbb
| 32 || August 29 || @ Blue Jays || 0–5 || Walker (3–2) || Cobb (1–3) ||—|| 14–18 || L4
|- bgcolor=#fbb
| 33 || August 30 || @ Blue Jays || 5–6 || Bass (2–1) || Sulser (1–4) ||—|| 14–19 || L5
|- bgcolor=#bfb
| 34 || August 31 || @ Blue Jays || 4–3 (11) || Valdez (1–0) || Bass (2–2) ||—|| 15–19 || W1
|-

|- bgcolor=#bfb
| 35 || September 1 || Mets || 9–5 || Eshelman (3–0) || Kilome (0–1) ||—|| 16–19 || W2
|- bgcolor=#fbb
| 36 || September 2 || Mets || 4–9 || Peterson (4–1) || Means (0–3) ||—|| 16–20 || L1
|- bgcolor=#fbb
| 37 || September 4 || Yankees || 5–6 (9) || Holder (2–0) || Lakins (2–2) || Green (1) || 16–21 || L2
|- bgcolor=#bfb
| 38 || September 4 || Yankees || 6–3 (7) || López (1–0) || García (0–1) || Valdez (1) || 17–21 || W1
|- bgcolor=#bfb
| 39 || September 5 || Yankees || 6–1 || Tate (1–0) || Cole (4–3) ||—|| 18–21 || W2
|- bgcolor=#bfb
| 40 || September 6 || Yankees || 5–1 || Kremer (1–0) || Tanaka (1–2) ||—|| 19–21 || W3
|- bgcolor=#bfb
| 41 || September 8 || @ Mets || 11–2 || Means (1–3) || Wacha (1–3) ||—|| 20–21 || W4
|- bgcolor=#fbb
| 42 || September 9 || @ Mets || 6–7 || Familia (2–0) || Harvey (0–1) || Díaz (3) || 20–22 || L1
|- bgcolor=#bbb
|—|| September 10 || @ Yankees || colspan=6 | Postponed (rain). Makeup Date September 11 as part of doubleheader
|- bgcolor=#fbb
| 43 || September 11 || @ Yankees || 0–6 (7) || Cole (5–3) || Cobb (1–4) ||—|| 20–23 || L2
|- bgcolor=#fbb
| 44 || September 11 || @ Yankees || 1–10 (7) || Tanaka (2–2) || Akin (0–1) ||—|| 20–24 || L3
|- bgcolor=#fbb
| 45 || September 12 || @ Yankees || 1–2  || Holder (3–0) || Harvey (0–2) ||—|| 20–25 || L4
|- bgcolor=#fbb
| 46 || September 13 || @ Yankees || 1–3 || Britton (1–2) || Tate (1–1) || Chapman (2) || 20–26 || L5
|- bgcolor=#cfc
| 47 || September 14 || Braves || 14–1 || López (2–0) || Toussaint (0–2) ||—|| 21–26 || W1
|- bgcolor=#fbb
| 48 || September 15 || Braves || 1–5 || O'Day (4–0) || Eshelman (3–1) ||—|| 21–27 || L1
|- bgcolor=#bfb
| 49 || September 16 || Braves || 5–1 || Akin (1–1) || Hamels (0–1) ||—|| 22–27 || W1 
|- bgcolor=#fbb
| 50 || September 17 || Rays || 1–3 (7) || Castillo (3–0) || Valdez (1–1) ||—|| 22–28 || L1
|- bgcolor=#fbb
| 51 || September 17 || @ Rays || 6–10 (7) || Fairbanks (5–3) || Sulser (1–5) ||—|| 22–29 || L2
|- bgcolor=#fbb
| 52 || September 18 || Rays || 1–2 || Glasnow (4–1) || Cobb (1–5) || Sherriff (1) || 22–30 || L3
|- bgcolor=#fbb
| 53 || September 19 || Rays || 1–3 || Morton (2–2) || López (2–1) || Thompson (1) || 22–31 || L4
|- bgcolor=#bfb
| 54 || September 20 || Rays || 2–1 || Means (2–3) || Yarbrough (1–4) || Valdez (2) || 23–31 || W1
|- bgcolor=#933
| 55 || September 22 || @ Red Sox || 3–8 || Pivetta (1–0) || Akin (1–2) || Barnes (9) || 23–32 || <span style="color:white;">L1
|- bgcolor=#fbb
| 56 || September 23 || @ Red Sox || 1–9 || Eovaldi (4–2) || Kremer (1–1) ||—|| 23–33 || L2
|- bgcolor=#bfb
| 57 || September 24 || @ Red Sox || 13–1 || Cobb (2–5) || Pérez (3–5) ||—|| 24–33 || W1
|- bgcolor=#fbb
| 58 || September 25 || @ Blue Jays || 5–10 || Pearson (1–0) || López (2–2) ||—|| 24–34 || L1
|- bgcolor=#fbb
| 59 || September 26 || @ Blue Jays || 2–5 || Anderson (1–2) || Means (2–4) || Bass (7) || 24–35 || L2
|- bgcolor=#bfb
| 60 || September 27 || @ Blue Jays || 7–5 || Lakins (3–2) || Yamaguchi (2–4) || Valdez (3) || 25–35 || W1
|-

Roster

Farm System

Due to safety concerns surrounding the COVID-19 pandemic, it was announced on June 30, 2020 that the 2020 Minor League Baseball season would not be played.

COVID-19 Outbreak
On July 27, 2020, both away games against the Miami Marlins were postponed due to the COVID-19 pandemic, because there was a COVID outbreak in the Miami Marlins organization, and later the Orioles′ home games were also postponed. As a result, the Orioles played the New York Yankees on July 29–30.

References

External links
2020 Baltimore Orioles season at official site
2020 Baltimore Orioles season at Baseball Reference

Baltimore Orioles seasons
Baltimore Orioles
Baltimore Orioles